The Mixed 10 metre air rifle standing SH2 event at the 2008 Summer Paralympics took place on September 11 at the Beijing Shooting Range Hall.

Qualification round

Q Qualified for final

Final

References

Shooting at the 2008 Summer Paralympics